K.P. & Envyi (born Khia Phillips and Susan Hedgepeth) is an American contemporary R&B and Hip Hop duo from Atlanta, Georgia and Charlotte, North Carolina, known for the 1998 single "Swing My Way"; which peaked  at #6 on the Billboard Hot 100, #14 on the UK Singles Chart, #14 on the New Zealand Singles Chart and #54 on the Dutch Single Top 100 and was certified Gold by the RIAA

2000s

K.P. was featured on Sick Beav's 2005 song "Close Range" alongside Lil B-Stone.

Envyi was featured on two tracks on Lil Zane's 2003 album The Big Zane Theory. In 2009, she changed her stage name to Sioux Lane and released the album Tell Me Why. Later, she appeared in the 2012 season of BET's competition reality show Sunday Best.

In 2005, both K.P. & Envyi participated in the song "Put Cha Hands Up" on Jermaine Dupri's compilation Young, Fly & Flashy, Vol. 1.

In 2011, K.P. & Envyi reunited to perform "Swing My Way" at the A-Town Legends Concert that took place in Atlanta.

References

African-American women rappers
American women rappers
American contemporary R&B musical groups
American hip hop groups
American girl groups
American musical duos
Contemporary R&B duos
Women hip hop groups
Hip hop duos
Female musical duos